Jessica Davenport, born June 24, 1985, is an American basketball player, formerly a reserve center for the WNBA's Indiana Fever.  She previously played for The Ohio State University's women's basketball team.

High school
Davenport played for Independence High School in Columbus, Ohio, where she was named a WBCA All-American. She participated in the 2003 WBCA High School All-America Game where she scored eight points.

College
Davenport is 6'5" tall and weighs 215 pounds.  Noted for her blocking and rebounding ability, she guided Ohio State to a 29–3 season and a number 1 seed in the NCAA tournament in 2005.

Ohio State statistics
Source

USA Basketball
Davenport was a member of the United States women's national basketball team in 2005 and 2006, while at Ohio state, and in 2007 and 2008 while on the New York Liberty team. Davenport was the third leading scorer on the 2005 World University Games Team in Izmir, Turkey. She helped the team to a 7–0 record, and a gold medal at the event. Davenport joined the National team in 2006 for the 2006 Opals World Challenge. The team went 4–1. winning all games other than the final against Australia. Davenport was also part of the National team in 2007–08, participating on the Tour of Italy and the Australia Exhibition. The National team was 4–0 on the Tour of Italy and 2–0 at the Australia Exhibition.

Professional

Davenport was drafted second overall by the San Antonio Silver Stars in the 2007 WNBA Draft.  Immediately thereafter, Davenport's rights were  traded to the New York Liberty along with the Silver Stars' 2008 first round draft pick in exchange for guard Becky Hammon and the Liberty's second round pick in 2008.  Within the Liberty's first five games, she developed a reputation as a consistent scorer and strong post presence.

Davenport was waived by the Liberty prior to the 2009 season. She was signed by the Fever as a replacement for the injured Yolanda Griffith.

Davenport has expressed a desire to pursue a career in marketing at the conclusion of her basketball career.

Notes

External links
Jessica Davenport Player Profile from The Ohio State University website

1985 births
Living people
All-American college women's basketball players
American expatriate basketball people in China
American women's basketball players
Basketball players from Columbus, Ohio
Centers (basketball)
Heilongjiang Dragons players
Indiana Fever players
New York Liberty players
Ohio State Buckeyes women's basketball players
Parade High School All-Americans (girls' basketball)
San Antonio Silver Stars draft picks
Universiade gold medalists for the United States
Universiade medalists in basketball
Big Ten Athlete of the Year winners
United States women's national basketball team players